The Box is a 2007 American crime film starring Gabrielle Union, A.J. Buckley, RZA, Giancarlo Esposito, Jason Winston George, Brett Donowho and written and directed by A.J. Kparr.

Plot
A disgraced former LAPD cop leads a home invasion in search of millions in stolen money.  The crime goes wrong and homicide detectives seeking answers interrogate the only survivors, a thief and one of the victims.

References

External links

2007 films
American crime films
2000s crime films
2000s English-language films
2000s American films